Johnny Belinda is a 1948 American drama film, directed by Jean Negulesco, based on the 1940 Broadway stage hit of the same name by Elmer Blaney Harris. The play was adapted for the screen by writers Allen Vincent and Irma von Cube.

The story is based on an incident that happened near Harris's summer residence in Fortune Bridge, Bay Fortune, Prince Edward Island. The title character is based on the real-life Lydia Dingwell (1852–1931), of Dingwells Mills, Prince Edward Island. The film dramatizes the consequences of spreading lies and rumors, and the horror of rape. The latter subject had previously been prohibited by the Motion Picture Production Code. Johnny Belinda is widely considered to be the first Hollywood film for which the restriction was relaxed, and as such was controversial at the time of its initial release.

The film stars Jane Wyman, Lew Ayres, Charles Bickford, Agnes Moorehead, Stephen McNally, and Jan Sterling. Wyman's performance earned her the Academy Award for Best Actress.

It was filmed on location in Fort Bragg, California.

Plot

Belinda MacDonald is a deaf-mute young woman living on Cape Breton Island on the east coast of Canada. Belinda is befriended by Dr. Robert Richardson, the new physician who recently moved to town. The doctor realizes that, although she cannot hear or speak, Belinda is very intelligent. She lives on a farm with her father, Black MacDonald, and her aunt, Aggie MacDonald. She wears plain work clothes, rarely goes into town, and only once to church. The family raises cattle and sheep and makes a small living grinding local wheat into flour at their small mill. Her father and aunt called Belinda "Dummy" and resent her because her mother died giving birth to her. Dr. Richardson teaches Belinda sign language and the signs for many common things and ideas. She learns to read.  Over time, his affection for her grows. He buys her a pretty dress and encourages her father to take her to town and church.

Dr. Richardson's secretary, Stella, is attracted to him and tries to get his attention, but the doctor does not reciprocate her feelings. After Stella figures out that he is becoming attracted to Belinda, she starts to resent both of them.

One of the family's customers, Laughlin "Locky" McCormick, meets Belinda when he and a group of young people stop by the MacDonald farm to pick up their orders of flour and ground grain. Locky is dating Stella at the time. Stella notices Locky noticing Belinda, and warns Locky to "stay away from the dummy." Locky gets drunk at a dance, leaves the dance, and goes to the farm where Belinda is alone, and rapes her. This results in her pregnancy, which is diagnosed by another doctor to whom Dr. Richardson had brought her for audiology testing. Belinda gives birth at home to a healthy baby boy, whom she names Johnny. The people in town begin to shun the MacDonald family and Dr. Richardson, as they gossip that he must be Johnny's father. Dr. Richardson tells Black that he is willing to marry Belinda in order to quiet town gossip. Black rejects this idea, as he believes that Dr. Richardson does not truly love Belinda, but merely pities her. Boycotted by locals, the doctor leaves the small community and takes a position in a Toronto hospital. He writes Belinda suggesting he will return for her and Johnny.

Locky goes to the MacDonald farm under the pretense of purchasing ground barley, but really wants to get a look at baby Johnny. When Black sees him, he orders Locky to leave. Locky inadvertently boasts about the infant son, saying, "spittin' image of his father," revealing to Black that he is the father of the child. Black follows Locky and threatens to expose him to the town. They have a fight on a seaside cliff and Locky throws Black off the cliff into the sea, killing him. Town gossip calls it an accident and does not suspect Locky. They celebrate his wedding to Stella.

Belinda and her aunt Aggie try to operate the farm but they are struggling to pay the bills and keep the farm running. Farmers boycott their flour mill.  The town, at the urging of Locky, has a meeting and declares Belinda unfit to care for the child and award him to Locky and Stella. They come to take Johnny.  Belinda first makes Stella realize that she is a smart and competent mother.  She also makes it clear that she will never give up her baby. Stella retreats and tells Locky that the mother should keep Johnny.  Locky demands the baby, telling his wife that it is his son. When he goes to retrieve the boy, he pushes Belinda aside. Before Locky can unlock the upstairs door, Belinda kills him with a shotgun.  Belinda is arrested and goes on trial for murder. At the trial, Dr. Richardson testifies that she was protecting her property and family. The court dismisses this as the doctor's love for her, and is ready to sentence Belinda to execution, but finally Stella blurts out that her husband Locky had confessed the truth about the rape to her on the day he was killed. Belinda is set free, and she, Johnny, Dr. Richardson and Aggie leave together.

Main cast and characters

Other cast members

Reception

Box office
The film was a huge financial success, earning $4,266,000 domestically and $2,721,000 foreign.

The film was the second most popular movie at the British box office in 1948.

Critical reaction
Bosley Crowther of The New York Times wrote that while some of the scenes "were pretty lurid, especially towards the end," that "the best of the film is absorbing, and Miss Wyman, all the way through, plays her role in a manner which commands compassion and respect." William Brogdon of Variety called it "somber, tender, [and] moving," with Wyman's performance "a personal success." John McCarten of The New Yorker thought the screenplay was "far superior" to the script of the original play, and that the actors were "all convincing, particularly Jane Wyman, who is cast as the badgered heroine." The Monthly Film Bulletin called it "a memorable film in which Jane Wyman's performance as Belinda is outstanding." "A powerful dramatic entertainment," wrote Harrison's Reports. "The direction, acting, and photography are of a superior quality, but the outstanding thing about the picture is the exceptionally fine performance by Jane Wyman, an acting job that will undoubtedly make her a foremost contender for the Academy Award."

Content aggregator Rotten Tomatoes reports a 91% "Fresh" rating based on 10 out of 11 surveyed critics giving the film a positive review.

Accolades

The film is recognized by American Film Institute in these lists:
 2005: AFI's 100 Years of Film Scores – Nominated

Later versions
The film was remade first as a 1967 television movie starring Mia Farrow as Belinda, Ian Bannen as her doctor, and David Carradine as the rapist, and in 1982 as another TV remake with Rosanna Arquette as Belinda and Richard Thomas as the VISTA worker. Also, live versions aired on the US network NBC on October 13, 1958, as part of the Hallmark Hall of Fame series and on Australian television in 1959 as part of the Shell Presents series.

See also

List of films featuring the deaf and hard of hearing

References

Further reading
 Leff, Leonard J. "What in the World Interests Women? Hollywood, Postwar America, and 'Johnny Belinda.'" Journal of American Studies 31#32 (1997), pp. 385–405. online
 Schuchman, John S. Hollywood speaks: Deafness and the film entertainment industry (U of Illinois Press, 1999).

External links

 
 
 
 
 
 

1948 films
1948 drama films
American black-and-white films
American drama films
American films based on plays
American Sign Language films
Best Drama Picture Golden Globe winners
Films about deaf people
Films about rape
Films based on works by American writers
Films directed by Jean Negulesco
Films featuring a Best Actress Academy Award-winning performance
Films featuring a Best Drama Actress Golden Globe-winning performance
Films produced by Jerry Wald
Films scored by Max Steiner
Films set on farms
Films set in Nova Scotia
Warner Bros. films
1940s English-language films
1940s American films
Films about disability